Amy Smith (born 16 November 2004) is an Australian cricketer who plays as a right-arm leg break bowler and right-handed batter for the Tasmanian Tigers in the Women's National Cricket League (WNCL) and the Hobart Hurricanes in the Women's Big Bash League (WBBL). She made her professional debut in a WNCL match at the age of just 14 and, at the age of 15, was the youngest player in the 2020–21 WBBL. Before the 2020–21 season, Smith won the Tasmanian Female Young Player of the Year award for the second of two years in a row.

International career
In December 2022, Smith was selected in the Australia Under-19 squad for the 2023 ICC Under-19 Women's T20 World Cup.

References

External links

Amy Smith at Cricket Australia

2004 births
Living people
Australian women cricketers
Hobart Hurricanes (WBBL) cricketers
Place of birth missing (living people)
Tasmanian Tigers (women's cricket) cricketers